Jacques de Châtillon or James of Châtillon (died 11 July 1302) was Lord of Leuze, of Condé, of Carency, of Huquoy and of Aubigny, the son of Guy III, Count of Saint-Pol and Matilda of Brabant. He married Catherine of Condé and had issue.

King Philip IV of France attempted to annex the County of Flanders by appointing Jacques as governor of the County in 1300. The Flemish Count Guy of Dampierre and his two sons had been imprisoned by the French.

After his appointment, Jacques de Châtillon entered Bruges. The imposition of heavy taxes, extortions by pro-French Flemish nobles and a visit by King Philip to Bruges in 29 May 1301, resulted in angering the local populace. A number of local movements erupted, such as in Bruges, where on 19 May 1302, the French garrison at Bruges was massacred. Jacques fled Bruges, but died a few months later at the Battle of the Golden Spurs in July 1302.

References

Sources

1302 deaths
Jacques

Year of birth unknown